Charlotte Bendaoud (born 14 March 1983), known by her stage name Vitaa, is a French singer-songwriter.

Biography
Vitaa was discovered by DJ Kost, who paired her with Dadoo in a duet . They sang "Pas à pas" ('Step by Step'). It was at this event that she was first called "Vitaa."

She worked for several years in collaboration with various hip hop and R&B artists and eventually with Diam's and Pit Baccardi on Oublie, then a solo on the album Première classe RnB with the song "Ma sœur" ('My Sister'). She performed a second duet with Dadoo, "Sur ta route" ('On Your Way'), then made several more duets with various other singers, including "Mytho" with Mafia K'1 Fry, "Bol d'air" with Rohff and Jasmin. Vitaa later collaborated with Diam's on the song "Confessions Nocturnes", with which she became known to the general French public.

Since then, Vitaa has appeared on the track "Peur d'aimer" ('Fear of Loving') with Nessbeal and "Ne dis jamais" ('Never Say') with Sinik.

The first artist signed to the label Motown France, Vitaa released her debut solo album A fleur de toi on 5 February 2007, which peaked at number one in France. The music video for the album's title track was filmed in Montreal, Quebec, Canada.

Vitaa was the opening act for Rihanna's Last Girl on Earth show in Paris.

Discography

Albums

Singles
Charting singles

*Did not appear in the official Belgian Ultratop 50 charts, but rather in the bubbling under Ultratip charts.

Other singles
2007: "Ma soeur"
2007: "Toi"
2007: "Pourquoi les hommes?"
2008: "Mon paradis secret"
2009: "Une fille pas comme les autres"
2010: "Pour que tu restes"

Featured in

*Did not appear in the official Belgian Ultratop 50 charts, but rather in the bubbling under Ultratip charts.

Collaborations
"Pas à Pas" with Dadoo
"Mytho" with Mafia K'1 Fry
"Bol d'air" with Rohff
"Oublie" with Pit Baccardi and Diam's
"Sur ta route" with Dadoo
"Fille facile" with Dadoo
"C.B" with Casus Belli
"Confessions nocturnes" with Diam's; (It was parodied by Fatal Bazooka featuring Vitoo as "Mauvaise foi nocturne" (Pascal Obispo is Vitoo))
"Ne dis jamais" with Sinik
"La gomme" with Diam's
"Peur d'aimer" with Nessbeal
"Ma sœur" remix with Mac Tyer
"Ma sœur" remix with Diam's
"Tu Peux Choisir" with Gage

References

External links
 Official website

1983 births
Living people
Musicians from Mulhouse
21st-century French singers
21st-century French women singers